Kitenge Kitengewa (born 27 June 1962) is a Congolese former professional boxer who competed from 1987 to 1989, and held the African super-welterweight title in 1989. As an amateur, he competed in the men's welterweight event at the 1984 Summer Olympics.

See also
 List of African Boxing Union champions

References

External links
 

1962 births
Living people
Democratic Republic of the Congo male boxers
Olympic boxers of the Democratic Republic of the Congo
Boxers at the 1984 Summer Olympics
Place of birth missing (living people)
Welterweight boxers
Light-middleweight boxers
African Boxing Union champions
21st-century Democratic Republic of the Congo people